Mythology is a box set compilation of recordings by the Gibb Brothers, mostly performed as the Bee Gees, arranged in a four disc set each highlighting a Gibb brother. Barry and Robin chose their own songs (presumably their personal favourites), with Maurice's songs selected by his widow Yvonne and Andy's songs selected by his daughter Peta. Several U.S. and U.K. hits are absent from this collection including "Lonely Days", "How Can You Mend a Broken Heart", "You Should Be Dancing", "Nights on Broadway", "World" and "One".

Background
All of the songs on Barry's & Robin's disc have already been released on CD, though several are receiving new remasters by Rhino/Reprise, which is true for all the songs in this set. Maurice's disc includes two unreleased tracks from 1999, "Angel of Mercy" and "The Bridge", as well as his 1984 single "Hold Her in Your Hand", which makes its CD debut. Missing from Maurice's disc is his jazzy "My Thing" from 1970 and a rare B-side, "I've Come Back" from 1970, of which the latter has never been released on CD. Andy's disc contains his previously unreleased final song from 1987, "Arrow Through the Heart", which was briefly heard on Behind the Music: Andy Gibb.

Originally scheduled to be released on 3 November 2009, it was subsequently pushed back to March 2010, but was removed from Rhino's release schedule as that date approached. The set was eventually released on 15 November 2010. During Barry & Robin's appearance on Late Night with Jimmy Fallon in March, the set was shown complete with liner notes and pictures.

Barry says in liner notes, "They say the future is always brighter if you can let go of the past, but the Bee Gees will live forever in my heart. These are pretty much our personal favorites. When I look back now, it is more about the journey, not the arrival. Robin adds in liner notes. This is now the Bee Gees 50th anniversary. And by the Bee Gees, I mean all four brothers". Robin adds: "I always see our songs as 'just us brothers' having a good time. When I look back now, it is more about the journey, not the arrival".

Mythology also features a collection of family photos, many never-before published, along with tributes from artists such as George Martin, Brian Wilson, Elton John, Graham Nash, and the band's long-time manager Robert Stigwood.

Track listing

Disc 1 – Barry

Disc 2 – Robin

Disc 3 – Maurice

Disc 4 – Andy

Charts

Weekly charts

Year-end charts

Decade-end charts

Certifications

References

2010 compilation albums
Bee Gees compilation albums
Andy Gibb albums
Reprise Records compilation albums
Warner Records compilation albums
Albums recorded at IBC Studios